Jaskaran Singh may refer to:

 Jaskaran Singh (cricketer, born 1989), Indian cricketer who plays for Chandigarh
 Jaskaran Singh (cricketer, born 1991), Indian cricketer who plays for Jharkhand
 Jas Singh (cricketer, born 2002), English cricketer who plays for Kent